Nyhan is a surname. Notable people with the surname include:

Brendan Nyhan (born 1978), American liberal to moderate political blogger, author, and political columnist
David Nyhan (1940–2005), journalist
Denis Nyhan, driver of standardbred racehorses in New Zealand's premier racing events
William Nyhan (born 1926), Professor of Pediatrics at UC San Diego School of Medicine in La Jolla, CA

See also
Lesch–Nyhan syndrome (LNS), a rare, inherited disorder caused by a deficiency of the enzyme hypoxanthine-guanine phosphoribosyltransferase
Sakati–Nyhan–Tisdale syndrome, a rare genetic disorder associated with abnormalities in the leg bones, congenital heart defects and craniofacial defects